Milky Cotton is the first album by Megumi Odaka (1988).

Track listing
"Natsugoro" – 4:09
"Shiroi Hiyōshi no Heroine" – 3:52
"Himawari to Taiyō" – 4:18
"Blue Wind" – 4:04
"Navigation" – 3:41
"Yuubae no Douro" (michi) – 4:12
"Kanashimi manaide" – 4:32
"Ame ga Futteita Natsu no Hi" – 4:28

Credits
Director: Mitsuo Shimano
A. director: Koichi Ujiie
mix engineer: Noriyasu Murase
mix a. engineers: Makoto Niijima, Mitsuo Sawanobori
mix studios: Kawaguchi-ko, Hitokuchizaka
recording engineers: Noriyasu Murase, Hisao Kemori, Yoshinori Waraya
recording studios: Kawaguchi-ko, Hitokuchizaka, Sky, Sound Inn, Take One, Cherry Island, Sound Valley, Roppongi-Sony
All songs composed and arranged by Tsugutoshi Goto
All lyrics written by Eiko Kyo
art director: Isao Sakai
designer: Rikaco Furuya
photographer: Kousaku Hakoda
stylist: Hiromi Shintani
hair & make-up: Makiko Takahashi
artist managers: Tomokazu Ichimura, Noriko Ishimura
disc promoter: Yukihiro Hoshino
sales promoter: Michiko Odaka
music co-ordinator: Daybreak

References

1988 albums
Pony Canyon albums
Megumi Odaka albums